Maoz may refer to:

Given name 
Maoz Samia (born 1987), Israeli footballer

Surname 
Samuel Maoz (born c. 1962), Israeli film director
Eyal Maoz (born 1969), Israeli-born American guitarist, bandleader, solo performer and composer
Zeev Maoz (born 1951), American Professor of Political Science and Director of the Correlates of War Project at the University of California, Davis
Avi Maoz (born 1956), Israeli politician

Ships
 INS Ma'oz (K 24), an Israeli Navy ship which previously served in the United States Navy as

See also 
Maoz Haim, is a kibbutz in Israel
Maoz Haim Synagogue, is a basilica building in Israel
Ma'oz Tzur, is a Jewish liturgical poem or piyyut